"Que Se Sienta El Deseo" is a song recorded by Wisin as the second single from his third studio album, Los Vaqueros 3: La trilogía (2015). It was released on September 4, 2015.

Music video
The music video was directed by Jessy Terrero and released on October 2, 2015.

Chart performance
Que Se Sienta El Deseo entered the Billboard charts in September 2015 and peaked in December at number fifteen on the Hot Latin Songs (number four on Latin Airplay and number twelve on Latin Digital Songs). Other peaks include: number three on Latin Rhythm Airplay, number four on Latin Pop Airplay, number thirty-seven on Tropical Songs, and number seven on Latin Rhythm Digital Songs. "Que Se Sienta El Deseo" also reached number thirty-five on Mexican Espanol Airplay.

Live performances
Wisin and Ricky Martin performed the song at the Latin Grammy Awards on November 19, 2015.

Cover versions
"Que Se Sienta El Deseo" was covered by the contestants of Latin American singing competition series, La Banda. It was performed live during the semi-final on December 6, 2015.

Charts

References

2015 singles
Wisin songs
Ricky Martin songs
Songs written by Wisin
2015 songs
Sony Music Latin singles
Music videos directed by Jessy Terrero